The following lists local and international movies which were either depicted or set in Singapore at least in part.

1930s
 Rich and Strange (1931)
 Bring 'Em Back Alive (1932)
 Out of Singapore (1932)
 Samarang or Shark Woman (1932)
 Wild Cargo (1934)
 Fang and Claw (1935)
 Booloo (1938)
 Singapore: Cross-roads of the East (1938)

1940s
 The Adventures of Chinese Tarzan (1940)
 The Letter (1940)
 Road to Singapore (1940)
 Jungle Cavalcade (1941)
 Mare Senki: Shingeki no kiroku / Malayan War Record: A Record of the Offensive (マレー戦記: 進撃の記錄) (1942)
 Sensen Nimankiro / Twenty Thousand Kilometre Battle Front (戦線二万粁) (1942)
 Marai No Tora / The Tiger of Malaya (マライの虎) (1943)
 Chinta (1948)
 Nasib (1949)
 Nilam (1949)

1950s
 Aloha (1950)
 Dewi Murni (1950)
 Kembar (1950)
 Pembalasan (1950)
 Racun Dunia (1950)
 Juwita (1951)
 Pembalasan (1951)
 Rayuan Sukma (1951)
 Sejoli (1951)
 Aladdin (1952)
 Anjuran Nasib (1952)
 Antara Senyum Dan Tangis (1952)
 Jiwa Lara (1952)
 Patah Hati (1952)
 Sedarah (1952)
 Tas Tangan Wanita (1952)
 Ayer Mata (1953)
 Hujan Panas (1953)
 Ibu (1953)
 Istana Impian (1953)
 Putus Harapan (1953)
 Sangsara (1953)
 Siapa Salah? (1953)
 Arjuna (1954)
 Iman (1954)
 Malaya Love Affair (马来亚之恋) (1954)
 Merana (1954)
 Panggilan Pulau (1954)
 Pretty Girl from Kuala Lumpur (槟城艳) (1954)
 World for Ransom (1954)
 Menyerah (1955)
 Penarik Beca (1955)
 Ribut (1955)
 Adek Ku (1956)
 Anak-ku Sazali (1956)
 Hang Tuah (1956)
 Semerah Padi (1956)
 Blood Stains The Valley of Love (血染相思谷) (1957)
 Bujang Lapok (1957)
 China Wife (唐山阿嫂) (1957)
 Kaseh Sayang (1957)
 Kembali Seorang (1957)
 Mogok (1957)
 Moon Over Malaya (椰林月) (1957)
 Panca Delima (1957)
 Putera Bertopeng (1957)
 Singapore: The Lion City (1957)
 Taufan (1957)
 Anak Pontianak (1958)
 Azimat (1958)
 Doktor (1958)
 Gergasi (1958)
 Hantu Kubur (1958)
 Kaki Kuda (1958)
 Mahsuri (1958)
 Masharakat Pincang (1958)
 Matahari (1958)
 Sarjan Hassan (1958)
 Satay (1958)
 Serangan Orang Minyak (1958)
 Sumpah Orang Minyak (1958)
 Sumpah Pontianak (1958)
 Air Hostess (空中小姐) (1959)
 Bawang Puteh Bawang Merah (1959)
 Dandan Setia (1959)
 Jula Juli Bintang Tiga (1959)
 Korban Fitnah (1959)
 Musang Berjanggut (1959)
 Nujum Pak Belalang (1959)
 Pendekar Bujang Lapok (1959)
 Raden Mas (1959)
 Rasa Sayang Eh (1959)
 Saudagar Minyak Urat (1959)

1960s
 Singapore (1960)
 Ibu Mertuaku (1962)
 King Rat (1965)
 Gerak Kilat (1966)
 
 Pretty Polly (1967)
 
 
 Avanthan Manithan (1968) (அவன்தான் மனிதன்)
 The Virgin Soldiers (1969)
 Wit’s End (1969)

1970s
 G.I. Executioner, Dragon Lady, Wild Dragon Lady or Wit's End (1975)
 Priya (1978) (பிரியா)
 Ninaithale inikkum (1979) (நினைத்தாலே இனிக்கும்)
 Saint Jack (1979)
 They Call Her Cleopatra Wong (1978)
 Singaporenalli Raja Kulla (1978) (Kannada: ಸಿಂಗಾಪೂರ್‌ನಲ್ಲಿ ರಾಜಾ ಕುಳ್ಳ)

1980s
 Ullasa Paravaigal (1980)
 The Highest Honor (1982)
 Privates on Parade (1982)
 David Bowie: Ricochet (1983)
 Souten (1983)
 Tanah Merah (1983) (TV movie, Hollywood )
 Miss Singapore (1985)
 Passion Flower (1986)
 Seven Years Itch (1987) 七年之痒
 Casino Raiders (1989) 至尊无上
 Raffles Hotel (1989)
 Tanamera: Lion of Singapore (1989)

1990s
 Ooru Vittu Ooru Vanthu (1990) (ஊரு விட்டு ஊரு வந்து)
 The Cage (1991) (short film)
 The Last Blood (1991) 惊天十二小时
 Medium Rare (1991)
 Tears and Triumph (1994) 昨夜长风
 Bagong Bayani (1995)
 Bugis Street (1995) 妖街皇后
 Mee Pok Man (1995)
 Army Daze (1996)
 Fatal Reaction: Singapore (1996)
 Final Cut (1996) (short film)
 12 Storeys (1997)　12楼
 Aur Pyaar Ho Gaya (1997)
 God or Dog (1997)　大巴窑杀童案
 Paradise Road (1997)
 A Road Less Travelled (1997)　轨道
 Forever Fever (1998) 狂热迪斯科
 Money No Enough (1998) 钱不够用
 The Teenage Textbook Movie (1998)
 Tiger's Whip (1998)　虎鞭
 Bailiu libai, Lucky Number or Saturday, Sunday (1999)　拜六．礼拜
 Eating Air (1999) 吃风
 Gen-X Cops (1999) 特警新人类
 Liang Po Po: The Movie (1999) 梁婆婆重出江湖
 The Mirror (1999) 午夜凶镜
 Rogue Trader (1999)
 Sex: The Annabel Chong Story (1999)
 Street Angels (1999) 少女党
 That One No Enough (1999) 那个不够
 The Truth About Jane and Sam (1999) 真心话
 Where Got Problem? (1999) 问题不大

2000s
 2000 AD (2000) 公元2000年
 Chicken Rice War (2000) 鸡缘巧合
 In the Mood for Love (2000) 花样年华
 Stories about Love (2000)
 When I Fall in Love...With Both (2000) 月亮的秘密
 Winner Takes All (2000) 
 Ajnabee (2001) अजनबी
 Fulltime Killer (2001) 全职杀手
 One Leg Kicking (2001)　一脚踢
 Return to Pontianak (2001)
 August (2001) (short film)
 The Tree (2001) 孩子．树
 6horts #4: Checkpoint (2002) (short film)
 24 Hours (2002)
 I Not Stupid (2002) 小孩不笨
 Talking Cock the Movie (2002) 讲鸟话
 15 (2003)
 After School 放学后 (2003)
 City Sharks (2003)
 Homerun (2003) 跑吧,孩子
 Twilight Kitchen (2003) 聚味楼
 2046 (2004)
 The Alien Invasion (2004) (short film)
 Avatar (2004) 流放化身
 The Best Bet (2004) 突然发财
 Clouds in My Coffee (2004)
 The Eye 2 (2004) 见鬼 2
 I Do I Do (2004) 爱都爱都
 Perth (2004)
 Pudhukottaiyilirundhu Saravanan (2004) (புதுக்கோட்டையிலிருந்து சரவணன்)
 Rice Rhapsody or Hainan Chicken Rice (2004) 海南鸡饭
 A Sharp Pencil (2004)
 Vanda (2004)
 4:30 (2005)
 Be with Me (2005) 伴我行
 The Maid (2005) 女佣
 One More Chance (2005) 3个好人
 Singapore GaGa (2005)
 Unarmed Combat (2005) 铁男
 Cages (2006)
 The High Cost of Living (2006) 生活的代价
 I Not Stupid Too (2006) 小孩不笨2
 Krrish (2006)
 Pyaar Impossible! (2006) प्यार इम्पॉसिबल!
 S11 (2006)
 Singapore Dreaming (2006) 美满人生
 Smell of Rain (2006) 雨之味
 One Last Dance (2007)
 Pirates of the Caribbean: At World's End (2007)
 Seven - The Spirit Return (2007) 七
 Dance of the Dragon (2008) 龙舞
 De Dana Dan (2009)  दे दना दन

2010s
 Singayil Gurushetram (2010) (சிங்கையில் குருசேத்ரம்)
 Red Dragonflies (2010)
 Already Famous (2011)
 Ignore All Detour Signs (2011)
 It's a Great, Great World (2011)
 Ah Boys to Men Part 1 (2012) (新兵正传)
 Sex.Violence.FamilyValues (2012)
 We Not Naughty (2012) (孩子不坏)
 Ah Boys to Men 2 (2013) (新兵正传II)
 Ilo Ilo (2013)
 Innocents (2013)
 Kan Pesum Vaarthaigal (2013) (கண் பேசும் வார்த்தைகள்)
 Sayang Disayang aka My Beloved Dearest (2013)
 That Girl in Pinafore (2013) (我的朋友, 我的同学, 我爱过的一切)
 Serangoon Road (2013) (HBO Asia first original series)
 03-FLATS (2014) (documentary)
 Afterimages (2014)
 Gone Case (2014) (TV movie)
 Inga Enna Solluthu (2014) (இங்க என்ன சொல்லுது)
 The Lion Men (2014)
 Ah Boys To Men 3: Frogmen (2015)
 Equals (2015)
 Hitman: Agent 47 (2015)
 Long Long Time Ago (2016)
 The Faith of Anna Waters (2016)
 Chennai 2 Singapore (2016) (filming) (சென்னை 2 சிங்கப்பூர்)
 Badrinath Ki Dulhaniya (2017) (Bollywood)
 Crazy Rich Asians (2018)
 Zombiepura (2018)
Detective Conan: The Fist of Blue Sapphire (2019)
Wet Season (2019)

See also
 List of Singaporean films
 List of movies based on location

References

 Singapore Film Hunter

 
Singapore